Wycliffe's Bible (WYC) is the name now given to a group of Bible translations into Middle English that were made under the direction of English theologian John Wycliffe. They appeared over a period from approximately 1382 to 1395. These Bible translations were the chief inspiration and chief cause of the Lollard movement, a pre-Reformation movement that rejected many of the distinctive teachings of the Catholic Church. In the early Middle Ages, most Western Christians encountered the Bible only in the form of oral versions of scriptures, verses and homilies in Latin (other sources were mystery plays, usually performed in the vernacular, and popular iconography). Though relatively few people could read at this time, Wycliffe's idea was to translate the Bible into the vernacular, saying "it helpeth Christian men to study the Gospel in that tongue in which they know best Christ's sentence".

Long thought to be the work of Wycliffe himself, the Wycliffe translations are now generally believed to be the work of several hands. Nicholas of Hereford is known to have translated a part of the text; John Purvey and perhaps John Trevisa are names that have been mentioned as possible authors. The translators worked from the Vulgate, the Latin Bible that was the standard Biblical text of Western Christianity. They included in the testaments those works which would later be called the Apocrypha by most Protestants (referred to as deuterocanonical by Roman Catholics and some Anglicans), along with 3 Esdras (which is now called 2 Esdras) and Paul's epistle to the Laodiceans.

Although unauthorised, the work was popular. Wycliffe Bible texts are the most common manuscript literature in Middle English. More than 250 manuscripts of the Wycliffe Bible survive. One copy sold at auction on 5 December 2016 for US$1,692,500.

The association between Wycliffe's Bible and Lollardy caused the Kingdom of England and the established Catholic Church in England to undertake a drastic campaign to suppress it. In the early years of the 15th century Henry IV (in his statute De haeretico comburendo), Archbishop Thomas Arundel, and Henry Knighton published criticism and enacted some of the severest religious censorship laws in Europe at that time. Even twenty years after Wycliffe's death, at the Oxford Convocation of 1408, it was solemnly voted that no new translation of the Bible should be made without prior approval. However, as the text translated in the various versions of the Wycliffe Bible was the Latin Vulgate, there was in practice no way by which the ecclesiastical authorities could distinguish the banned version; and consequently many Catholic commentators of the 15th and 16th centuries (such as Thomas More) took these manuscript English Bibles to represent an anonymous earlier orthodox translation. Consequently, manuscripts of the Wycliffe Bible, which when inscribed with a date always purport to precede 1409, the date of the ban, circulated freely and were widely used by clergy and laity.

Wycliffe as a Bible translator 

It is questioned whether Wycliffe himself translated the whole Bible. In any case, it is certain that in the fifteenth century portions of the Scriptures were called Wycliffite.

Supporters of the view that Wycliffe did translate the Bible hold that when Wycliffe took on the challenge of translating, he was breaking a long-held belief that no person should translate the Bible on their own initiative, without approval of the Church. It is said that his frustrations drove him to ignore this and that Wycliffe believed that studying the Bible was more important than listening to it read by the clergy.

At that time people mainly heard the Bible at church since they did not know how to read, and the Bible was costly (before the printing press). It is certain though that the Bible itself was familiar even to laymen in the fourteenth century and that the whole of the New Testament at least could be read in translations. Also during the Middle Ages one who could read, could read Latin also, and those who could not read Latin, usually could not read at all.

Wycliffe believed every Christian should study the Bible. When he met with opposition to the translation he replied "Christ and his apostles taught the people in that tongue that was best known to them. Why should men not do so now?" For one to have a personal relationship with God, Wycliffe believed that need to be described in the Bible. Wycliffe also believed that it was necessary to return to the primitive state of the New Testament in order to truly reform the Church and in order to do so, one must be able to read the Bible to understand those times.

Wycliffite versions of the Bible were sometimes condemned as such by the Catholic Church because a Wycliffite preface had been added to an orthodox translation.

Versions 

There are two distinct versions of Wycliffe's Bible that have been written. The earlier was translated during the life of Wycliffe, while the later version is regarded as the work of John Purvey. Since the printing press was not invented yet, there exist only a very few copies of Wycliffe's earlier Bible. The earlier Bible is a rigid and literal translation of the Latin Vulgate Bible, and Wycliffe's view of theology is closer to realism than to the spiritual. This version was translated word for word, which often led to confusion or meaninglessness. It was aimed towards the less learned clergymen and the laymen, while the second, more coherent version was aimed towards all literates. It is important to note that after the translations the illiterate and poor still usually lacked the access to the Scripture: the translation originally cost four marks and forty pence, i.e. two pounds, sixteen shillings and eightpence. During Wycliffe's time Bibles were also used as a law-code, which dominated civil law, giving extreme power to the church and religious leaders who knew Latin. The literal taste of the earlier translation was used to give Wycliffe's Bible an authoritative tone. The earlier version is said to be written by Wycliffe himself and Nicholas of Hereford.

Surviving copies of the Wycliffite Bible fall into two broad textual families, an "early" version and a later version. Both versions are flawed by a slavish regard to the word order and syntax of the Latin originals; the later versions give some indication of being revised in the direction of idiomatic English. A wide variety of Middle English dialects are represented. The second, revised group of texts is much larger than the first. Some manuscripts contain parts of the Bible in the earlier version, and other parts in the later version; this suggests that the early version may have been meant as a rough draft that was to be recast into the somewhat better English of the second version. The second version, though somewhat improved, still retained a number of infelicities of style, as in its version of Genesis 1:3

Latin Vulgate: ""
Early Wycliffe: ""
Later Wycliffe: ""
Douay–Rheims: "And God said: Be light made. And light was made"

The familiar verse of John 3:16 is rendered in the later Wycliffe version as:

Later Wycliffe: ""
King James Version: "For God so loved the world, that he gave his only begotten Son, that whosoever believeth in him should not perish, but have everlasting life."

The later revised version of Wycliffe's Bible was issued ten to twelve years after Wycliffe's death. This version is translated by John Purvey, who diligently worked on the translation of Wycliffe's Bible, as can be seen in the General Prologue, where Purvey explains the methodology of translating holy scriptures. He describes four rules all translators should acknowledge:

Church reaction and controversy 
At this time, the Peasants' Revolt was running full force as the people of England united to rebel against the unfairness of the English Parliament and its favouring of the wealthier classes. William Courtenay, the Archbishop of Canterbury, was able to turn both the church and Parliament against Wycliffe by falsely stating that his writings and his influence were fuelling the peasants involved in the revolt. (It was actually John Ball, another priest, who was involved in the revolt and merely quoted Wycliffe in one of his speeches.) The Church and Parliament's anger towards Wycliffe's "heresy" led them to form the Blackfriars Synod in order to remove Wycliffe from Oxford. Although this Synod was initially delayed by an earthquake that Wycliffe himself believed symbolised "the judgement of God", it eventually re-convened. At this synod, Wycliffe's writings (Biblical and otherwise) were quoted and criticised for heresy. This Synod ultimately resulted in King Richard II ruling that Wycliffe be removed from Oxford, and that all who preached or wrote against Catholicism be imprisoned.

Then later on, after John Wycliffe was dead, The Council of Constance declared Wycliffe (on 4 May 1415) a heretic and under the ban of the Church. It was decreed that his books be burned and his remains be exhumed. In 1428, at the command of Pope Martin V, Wycliffe's remains were dug up, burned, and the ashes cast into the River Swift, which flows through Lutterworth. This is the most final of all posthumous attacks on John Wycliffe, but previous attempts had been made before the Council of Constance. The Anti-Wycliffite Statute of 1401 extended persecution to Wycliffe's remaining followers. The "Constitutions of Oxford" of 1408 aimed to reclaim authority in all ecclesiastical matters, specifically naming John Wycliffe in a ban on certain writings, and noting that translation of Scripture into English by unlicensed laity is a crime punishable by charges of heresy.

Influence on subsequent English Bibles 

Although Wycliffe's Bible circulated widely in the later Middle Ages, it had very little influence on the first English biblical translations of the reformation era such as those of William Tyndale (Tyndale Bible) and Miles Coverdale (Great Bible), as it had been translated from the Latin Vulgate rather than the original Greek and Hebrew. 

Consequently, it was generally ignored in later English Protestant biblical scholarship. However, due to the common use of surviving manuscripts of Wycliffe's Bible as works of an unknown Catholic translator, this version continued to circulate among 16th-century English Catholics, and many of its renderings of the Vulgate into English were adopted by the translators of the Rheims New Testament.

Wycliffe's Bible in print 

The earliest printed edition, of the New Testament only, was by John Lewis in 1731.

In 1850, Forshall and Madden published a four-volume critical edition of the Wycliffe Bible containing the text of the earlier and later versions in parallel columns. Forshall and Madden's edition retains the letter yogh (ʒ) but replaces the thorn (þ) with the digraph th.

In popular culture 

 Jorge Luis Borges mentions Wycliffe's Bible in his short story "The Book of Sand", where he calls it the "Black-letter Wyclif", in reference to the Blackletter script used to write the publication.

See also 
 General Prologue of the Wycliffe Bible
 List of most expensive books and manuscripts

Notes

References

Further reading 
 .
 .
 Wycliffe, John and John Purvey (2012), Wycliffe's Bible, A Modern-Spelling Version of their 14th Century Translation, with an Introduction by Terence P. Noble, Createspace,

External links

 . Searchable by phrase or chapter/verse reference.
 .
 ; gives each book on a single page
 .
 .
 .
 .
 .
 
 
 Manuscripts of Lichfield Cathedral - Digital facsimiles of the Cathedral's Wycliffe New Testament, University of Oklahoma
 https://www.scribd.com/document/324581901/Wycliffe-Bible-Early-Version - Early Version as downloadable .doc file

1380s books
Lollardy
History of Christianity in the United Kingdom
14th-century Christian texts
14th century in England
Bible translations into English
Middle English literature